Elf Titled is an album, the third release by Nintendocore band The Advantage. It is their second full-length studio album, and as with all their albums, all tracks are covers of music from video games.

Track listing
 Batman - Stage 1 – 2:27
 Contra - Alien's Lair / Boss Music – 2:56
 Double Dragon 3 - Egypt – 1:57
 DuckTales - Moon – 1:39
 Metroid - Kraid's Lair – 2:41
 Air Fortress - Not Fat Iced Caramel Hazelnut Soy Latte with Extra Whipped Cream – 2:28
 Bomberman 2 - Wiggy – 1:47
 Castlevania - Intro + Stage 1 – 1:28
 Solar Jetman - Braveheart Level – 2:48
 The Goonies 2 - Wiseman – 0:41
 Double Dragon 2 - Mission 5: Forest of Death – 2:24
 Castlevania III: Dracula's Curse - Boss Music / Willow - Village / Mega Man 2 - Bubble Man – 3:55
 Mega Man 2 - Stage Select / Metal Man – 2:04
 Castlevania II - Woods – 1:22
 Guardian Legend - Corridor 1 – 1:52
 Wizards and Warriors - Tree Trunk / Woods / Victory – 3:47

Members
The Advantage
 Robby Moncrieff - guitar, electric sitar, percussion, piano, organ, vocals, yelp, knobs
 Ben Milner - guitar, electric Sitar, Hammond organ, synth, percussion, vocals, knobs
 Spencer Seim - drums, vocal sensibility
 Carson McWhirter - bass, autoharp, percussion, vocals, SK-1, Hammond organ, knobs
Additional Personnel
 Antreo Pukay - additional vocals
 Jeremiah - additional percussion

References

2006 albums
The Advantage albums
5 Rue Christine albums